Project 23550 patrol ships is a class of armed icebreaking patrol ships with two vessels currently under construction for the Russian Navy at Admiralty Shipyards in Saint Petersburg, Russia ("Arktika" Type).  Two ships have been ordered from the Admiralty Shipyards in 2016. The ships are designed to patrol the Russian territorial waters and exclusive economic zone in the Arctic.

During the launching ceremony of the lead ship, it was announced that two additional ships of slightly revised design would be built for the Border Service of the Federal Security Service of the Russian Federation by Vyborg Shipyard ("Ermak" Type).

Design 

The ships will be equipped with two Project 03160 Raptor class patrol boats, a  helicopter and small hovercraft. The core crew is planned at 60 with accommodation for an additional 50 mission specialists. Armament will include a  naval gun (some sources state a  naval gun) and  Kalibr anti-ship missiles in the  container variant.

Project 23550 will have a diesel–electric power plant with four  Kolomna  generating sets consisting of  10D49 diesel engines driving alternators produced by Ruselprom. In addition, the ships will have two auxiliary diesel generating sets with Kolomna diesel engines and Ruselprom alternators. While the early concept featured ABB Azipod azimuthing propulsion units, the final design has conventional shaft lines, propellers and rudders. The  propulsion motors will be produced by Ruselprom.

The vessels are strengthened for navigation in ice-covered arctic seas according to the Russian Maritime Register of Shipping ice class Arc7.

Think tank Global Security pointed out several similarities between the 23550 design and Norway's Svalbard class, and Canada's .  All three class are of approximately the same displacement, capable of transitting similar depths of ice and have similar size crews, with room for mission specialist. The 23550 class is, however, much more heavily armed.

In 2020 it was announced that the Russian Navy would begin sea trials to test the installation of module containers on patrol vessels permitting such ships to carry significantly upgraded armaments tailored to different missions. The containers were envisaged to carry various weapons including sonars and torpedoes or anti-ship and cruise missiles.

Ships

References

External links 

 

Icebreakers of Russia
Patrol vessels of the Russian Navy
Proposed ships